L'Élève Ducobu is a 2011 French children's comedy film directed by Philippe de Chauveron. It is based on the eponymous comic series by Godi and Zidrou. The film features Élie Semoun, Joséphine de Meaux, Vincent Claude and Juliette Chappey. It was released on 22 June 2011.

Plot
Ducobu (Vincent Claude) is a lazy student who is fond of cheating. After being dismissed from one school, he is sent to Saint-Potache Primary School; if he does not perform well there, his parents will send him to boarding school. Ducobu concocts innovative methods of cheating in order to get by, much to the frustration of his teacher, Mr Latouche (Élie Semoun), who tries to catch Ducobu. Ducobu regularly attempts to copy the work of Léonie (Juliette Chappey), the top student in the class. Nevertheless, Ducobu and Léonie eventually become friends.

Cast
 Élie Semoun as Mr Latouche
 Joséphine de Meaux as Ms Rateau, the music teacher
 Vincent Claude as Ducobu
 Juliette Chappey as Léonie
 Bruno Podalydès as Hervé Ducobu, Ducobu's father
 Helena Noguerra as Adeline Gratin
 Lise Lamétrie as Mademoiselle Moute
 François Levantal as Pension Professor

References

2010s children's comedy films
French comedy films
French children's films
Films based on Belgian comics
Live-action films based on comics
Films set in schools
2011 comedy films
2011 films
Films directed by Philippe de Chauveron
2010s French films